The 2009 American Express – TED open was a professional tennis tournament played on outdoor hard courts. It was part of the 2009 ATP Challenger Tour. It took place in Istanbul, Turkey between 10 and 16 August 2009.

Singles entrants

Seeds

 Rankings are as of August 3, 2009.

Other entrants
The following players received wildcards into the singles main draw:
  Haluk Akkoyun
  Grigor Dimitrov
  Korhan Ural Ateş
  Tugay Köylü

The following players received entry from the qualifying draw:
  Frederik Nielsen
  Filip Prpic
  Sebastian Rieschick
  Ludovic Walter

Champions

Singles

 Illya Marchenko def.  Florian Mayer, 6–4, 6–4

Doubles

 Frederico Gil /  Filip Prpic def.  Grigor Dimitrov /  Marsel İlhan, 3–6, 6–2, [10–6]

References
Official website
ITF search 

American Express - TED Open
PTT İstanbul Cup
PTT